Tramaine Aunzola Richardson , (nee’ Davis) known professionally as Tramaine Hawkins (born October 11, 1951), is an American award–winning Gospel singer whose career spans over five decades. Since beginning her career in 1966, Hawkins has won two Grammy Awards, two Doves, and 19 Stellar Awards.

Biography

Early life and career
Hawkins was born in San Francisco, California to Roland and Lois (Cleveland) Davis. She grew up in the Ephesians Church of God in Christ located in Berkeley, California, pastored by her grandfather, the late Bishop E.E. Cleveland.

While still in high school, Hawkins and her friends, Mary McCreary, Elva Mouton, and Vet Stone, had a gospel group called the Heavenly Tones that performed at various venues around the Oakland and San Francisco areas. In 1966 the group recorded the album I Love the Lord for the Gospel label, part of Savoy Records, and a 45 for the Music City label called He's Alright. When Stone's older brother Sylvester, better known as Sly Stone, formed Sly & the Family Stone with their brother Freddie and friends Larry Graham, Cynthia Robinson, Jerry Martini, and Greg Errico, the Heavenly Tones were recruited directly out of high school to become Little Sister, Sly & the Family Stone's background vocalists for their recording. Hawkins left the group to focus solely on recording and singing gospel music.

At the age of 17, Hawkins sang on the Edwin Hawkins Singers Choir's single "Oh Happy Day". With her distinctive soprano and extensive vocal range, she became better known as a featured soloist with late husband Walter Hawkins' Love Center Choir as well as the Hawkins Family. Hawkins scored several hits as a solo artist in the 1980s while signed to Light Records, and released now-classic albums, such as her 1979 self-titled debut, Tramaine, and its 1983 follow-up Determined. Songs such as "Changed," "Goin Up Yonder", "He's That Kind Of Friend", Jesus Christ Is The Way" and "Highway" quickly became staples and fan favorites.

Mainstream career

Hawkins was briefly a member of the 1970s R&B/soul vocal group Honey Cone. The group recorded the R&B hit "Want Ads" which made its way back into the gospel genre by being sampled on Mary Mary's 2005 hit "Heaven". Hawkins also briefly sang with Andraé Crouch and The Disciples, singing lead on their Grammy-nominated 1970 release "Christian People." Hawkins is both famous and infamous for her mainstream success as a gospel artist. In the mid-1980s, she signed with A&M Records and released a pair of dance-oriented contemporary gospel albums. Her 1985 A&M debut The Search Is Over yielded dance chart singles such as "Child of the King," "In the Morning Time," and the monster club hit "Fall Down (Spirit of Love)". The latter topped the Billboard Dance Charts to A&M's delight.

However, Hawkins was somewhat ostracized by her core gospel music audience, who were soured by her music's lyrically neutral content and the heavy mainstream attention it received. Though "Fall Down" became one of the earliest gospel songs to crossover to mainstream charts, traditional fans balked. Nonetheless, Freedom followed in 1987, producing "The Rock" and its title track as singles. The latter was co-written and produced by The Jacksons. Nearly 15 years later, "Fall Down" received a resurgence of popularity as gospel singer Kelli Williams recorded a remake of the hit as "Fall Down 2000", produced by avant garde gospel artist Tonéx. Though the song had not been widely acknowledged in the gospel music community, the more than eight-minute extended dance mix was finally included on Hawkins's 2001 collection All My Best To You, Vol. 2. In the new millennium, Hawkins resurfaced on GospoCentric Records with a powerful release, Still Tramaine.  This album included traditional gospel songs along with a duet with ex-husband, the late Walter Hawkins, on "It's Your Power". Also included on Still Tramaine was a track titled "Over There", an uptempo track reminiscent of "Fall Down".

Hawkins won her first Grammy Award in 1981 for her participation performance on "The Lord's Prayer", along with her then-husband Walter Hawkins.

Return to form 
Following harsh criticism and backlash from the success of her A&M recordings, Hawkins signed with Sparrow and delivered 1988's The Joy That Floods My Soul, including the opener "All Things Are Possible." The stellar set quickly re-endeared Hawkins to her core audience. Between album releases, Hawkins made a  cameo on MC Hammer's 1990 pop-gospel hit "Do Not Pass Me By". She was also honored with a request to sing at the funeral of Sammy Davis, Jr. when the beloved entertainment legend died in May 1990. She was also a guest lead vocalist on Santana's June 1990 album "Spirits Dancing in the Flesh".

Though Joy That Floods was well received, that studio effort was eclipsed by the release of the concert recording Tramaine Hawkins Live in 1990. The grandiose recording with its sweeping arrangements and show-stopping medleys of fan favorites would become a benchmark in Hawkins' career. The set won the Grammy Award for Best Traditional Soul Gospel Album in 1991. Following her triumphant comeback, she became one of the first gospel artists to sign with Columbia Records when she released To A Higher Place in 1994.

Following this album's release, Hawkins took an extended hiatus from recording. New music would not surface until Hawkins' 2000 cameo appearance on gospel trio Trin-i-tee 5:7's recorded cover of her signature tune "Highway". Following this foreshadowing, Hawkins delivered the tour-de-force studio recording Still Tramaine in 2001 after signing a new contract with GospoCentric Records. The album would also give a nod to her former career as a dance-floor darling featuring Basement Boys club remixes of the single "By His Strength".

Hawkins again paid final tribute to an African-American legend when she was requested in 2005 to sing at the funeral service of civil rights activist Rosa Parks. Hawkins was also part of the Rosa Parks tribute recording "Something Inside So Strong" from A Celebration of Quiet Strength, featuring other gospel artists such as Vanessa Bell Armstrong and Daryl Coley.

Hawkins was inducted into the Gospel Hall of Fame. She received the James Cleveland Lifetime Achievement Award, and won two Stellar Awards for Female Vocalist of the Year and Traditional Female of the Year for her 2007 CD release I Never Lost My Praise (2007).

After the release of her second live album, I Never Lost My Praise, Hawkins embarked on a church tour across the United States. Lady Tramaine was the special guest along with Bishop Walter Hawkins, Bishop Rance Allen, Pastor Daryl Coley, Pastor Andrae' Crouch, Dorinda Clark-Cole, Karen Clark-Sheard and Joe Ligon of the Mighty Clouds of Joy on the Mary Mary project, singing "It Will Be Worth It".

She also returned to Bobby Jones Gospel in 2012 to perform "I Never Lost My Praise". In 2014, Hawkins joined fellow gospel star Donnie McClurkin on his album Duets, appearing on the track "My Past".

Personal life

While married to Walter Hawkins from 1971 until 1994 (23 years), the couple had two children, a son, Walter "Jamie" Hawkins (Sunny) and a daughter, Trystan Hawkins, with five granddaughters and three grandsons. Hawkins now refers to herself as "Lady Tramaine". She lives outside of Sacramento, California, with her husband Tommie Richardson Jr. She has one stepson, Demar (Chastity), and two step-grandsons.

Discography

Albums
1966: I Love the Lord (Gospel Records) (as member of the gospel group The Heavenly Tones)
1979: Tramaine (Light)
1983: Determined (Light) – #6 Gospel
1986: The Search Is Over (A&M)T – #2 Gospel, #33 R&B
1987: Freedom (A&M)T
1988: The Joy That Floods My Soul (Sparrow/Capitol) – #5 Gospel, #33 Christian
1990: Live (Sparrow) – #2 Gospel, #25 Christian
1994: To a Higher Place (Columbia) – #4 Gospel
2001: Still Tramaine (GospoCentric)T – #5 Gospel, #31 Heatseekers
2007: I Never Lost My Praise: Live (GospoCentric) – #12 Gospel

T Denotes albums released as Tramaine only, as opposed to Tramaine Hawkins.

Compilations
1986: Tramaine Treasury (Light)
1994: All My Best to You (Sparrow) – #38 Gospel
2001: All My Best to You, Vol. 2 (EMI Gospel)
2002: Mega 3 Collection (Light)
2008: Gospel Legacy (Light)
2015: 20th Century Masters - The Millennium Collection - The Best Of

Singles
1966: "He's Alright" (Music City) (as member of the gospel group The Heavenly Tones)
1986: "Fall Down (Spirit of Love)" (A&M) – #1 Dance, #7 R&B, UK #60
1986: "Child of the King" (A&M)
1986: "In the Morning Time" (A&M) – #21 Dance, #26 R&B 
1987: "The Rock" (A&M) - #22 Dance
1987: "Freedom" (A&M)
1992: "Do Not Pass Me By" (MC Hammer with Tramaine Hawkins) (Capitol/EMI) – #62 US, #15 R&B, #14 UK
1995: "I Found the Answer" (Columbia)
1995: "Who's Gonna Carry You" (Columbia)
2001: "By His Strength" (GospoCentric)
2007: "Excellent Lord" (GospoCentric)
2007: "I Never Lost My Praise" (GospoCentric)
2014: "My Past" (duet with Donnie McClurkin) (EMI Gospel)

References

External links
 
 

1951 births
African-American Christians
20th-century African-American women singers
American dance musicians
American gospel singers
American Pentecostals
GospoCentric artists
Grammy Award winners
Living people
Singers from San Francisco
21st-century African-American people
21st-century African-American women